Ghidfalău  is a commune in Covasna County, Transylvania, Romania composed of four villages:
Angheluș / Angyalos
Fotoș / Fotosmartonos
Ghidfalău / Gidófalva
Zoltan / Érfalvazoltán

It formed part of the Székely Land region of the historical Transylvania province. Until 1918, the village belonged to the Háromszék County of the Kingdom of Hungary. After the Treaty of Trianon of 1920, it became part of Romania.

Demographics

The commune has an absolute Székely Hungarian majority. According to the 2011 Census it has a population of 2,596 of which 98.42% or 2,555 are Hungarian.

References

Communes in Covasna County
Localities in Transylvania